The following highways are numbered 128:

Canada
 New Brunswick Route 128
 Ontario Highway 128 (former)
 Prince Edward Island Route 128

Costa Rica
 National Route 128

India
 National Highway 128 (India)

Japan
 Japan National Route 128

United States
 Alabama State Route 128
 Arkansas Highway 128
 California State Route 128
 Colorado State Highway 128
 Connecticut Route 128
 Florida State Road 128
 Georgia State Route 128
 Illinois Route 128
 Indiana State Road 128
 Iowa Highway 128
 K-128 (Kansas highway)
 Kentucky Route 128
 Louisiana Highway 128
 Maine State Route 128
 Maryland Route 128
 Massachusetts Route 128
 Massachusetts Route 128A (former)
 Missouri Route 128
 Nebraska Highway 128
 New Hampshire Route 128
 New Mexico State Road 128
 New York State Route 128
 County Route 128 (Cortland County, New York)
 County Route 128 (Jefferson County, New York)
 County Route 128 (Rensselaer County, New York)
 County Route 128 (Sullivan County, New York)
 County Route 128 (Tompkins County, New York)
 County Route 128 (Ulster County, New York)
 North Carolina Highway 128
 Ohio State Route 128
 Oklahoma State Highway 128
 Pennsylvania Route 128
 Rhode Island Route 128
 South Carolina Highway 128
 Tennessee State Route 128
 Texas State Highway 128
 Texas State Highway Loop 128
 Texas State Highway Spur 128 (former)
 Farm to Market Road 128
 Utah State Route 128
 Vermont Route 128
 Virginia State Route 128
 Virginia State Route 128 (1928-1933) (former)
 Washington State Route 128
 Wisconsin Highway 128

Territories
 Puerto Rico Highway 128